The Gauteng Department of Agriculture, Rural Development and Environment (GDARDE) is a department of the Gauteng provincial government in South Africa. It is responsible for agricultural affairs, environmental protection and nature conservation within Gauteng. It was formerly known as the Gauteng Department of Agriculture, Conservation and Environment (GDACE).

Nature reserves managed by the department 
 Abe Bailey Nature Reserve 
 Alice Glockner Nature Reserve
 Marievale Bird Sanctuary
 Roodeplaat Nature Reserve
 Suikerbosrand Nature Reserve

GDARD services 
Agriculture
Environment
Conservation
Veterinary services
Rural Development

References

External links 
 

Government of Gauteng
Gauteng